Paul Edwin Overby Jr. (born November 27, 1942) is an American author who disappeared on his way to Waziristan, in Pakistan's Federally Administered Tribal Areas, to interview Sirajuddin Haqqani. Overby's wife, Jane Larson, revealed it happened on May 17, 2014.  Journalists agreed not to publish his identity until January 2017, when she agreed to make his identity public.

Disappearance
Larson had believed Overby had been kidnapped by the Taliban.  However, on February 28, 2017, the Taliban released a statement denying that they had kidnapped Overby.

Reporters Without Borders called for his release, on January 27, 2017.  On March 19, 2019, journalist David Rodhe, a former hostage himself, noted in the New Yorker magazine, that Overby was one of the Americans still in captivity.

Later events
On May 8, 2018, the Federal Bureau of Investigation offered a $1 million reward for information leading to his rescue. In addition, the Rewards for Justice Program offered a $5 million reward for information leading to his location.

Publications
In 1993, Overby had published a book on the Soviet–Afghan War, Holy Blood: An Inside View of the Afghan War.

See also
List of kidnappings
List of people who disappeared

References

1942 births
2010s missing person cases
American male writers
Kidnapped American people
Missing people
Missing person cases in Pakistan